is a Japanese slalom canoeist who has competed at the international level since 2006.

Career 
Adachi won a gold medal in K1 event at the 2014 Asian Games.

He represented the host country in the K1 event at the delayed 2020 Summer Olympics in Tokyo, where he finished 16th after being eliminated in the semifinal.

World Cup individual podiums

References

External links

1990 births
Living people
People from Sagamihara
Sportspeople from Kanagawa Prefecture
Japanese male canoeists
Canoeists at the 2020 Summer Olympics
Asian Games medalists in canoeing
Canoeists at the 2014 Asian Games
Canoeists at the 2018 Asian Games
Asian Games gold medalists for Japan
Asian Games silver medalists for Japan
Medalists at the 2014 Asian Games
Medalists at the 2018 Asian Games
Olympic canoeists of Japan